Elisabeth Neumann-Viertel (5 April 1900 – 24 December 1994) was an Austrian actress who started her career in Germany during the 1920s. Under the Nazi regime she emigrated to the United States, where she appeared on the Broadway and in a few Hollywood movies. She later returned to Germany, where she worked with numerous successful theatres of Berlin, among them Fritz Kortner's Berliner Bühnen. Neumann-Viertel was also a notable character actress in films and television, although she seldom played a leading role there. She retired in the late 1980s after nearly 70 years of acting. Elisabeth Neumann-Viertel was the second wife of film director Berthold Viertel.

Partial filmography

 Sister Veronika (1927)
 The Merry Vineyard (1927) - Frl. Stenz
 Doña Juana (1927) - Ines' Freundin Clara
 M (1931) - (uncredited)
 The Murderer Dimitri Karamazov (1931) - Fenja
 Donogoo Tonka (1936) - Auswandererfrau
 Boccaccio (1936) - Junge Frau aus Ferrara
 Lucky Kids (1936)
 Ave Maria (1936) - Konzertbesucherin
 The Strange Death of Adolf Hitler (1943) - Mizzi
 The House on 92nd Street (1945) - Freda Kassel (uncredited)
 The Eternal Waltz (1954) - Mutter Strauß
 Beichtgeheimnis (1956) - Frau Blendinger
 The Secret Ways (1961) - Olga Kovac
 The Wonderful World of the Brothers Grimm (1962) - Flower Vendor (uncredited)
 Freud: The Secret Passion (1962) - Frau Bernays, Martha's Mother (uncredited)
 Kurzer Prozess (1967)
 Heidi (1968, TV Movie) - Grandmother
 Cabaret (1972) - Fraulein Schneider
 The Odessa File (1974) - Frau Wenzer
 Kara Ben Nemsi Effendi (1975, TV Series) - Einödbäuerin
 Derrick (1978, TV Series) - Frau Ellweg
 The Fifth Musketeer (1979) - Oberin im Kloster
 The American Success Company (1980)
  (1983) - Grandmother
 Happy Weekend (1983)
 The Little Drummer Girl (1984) - Mrs. Minkel
 Why Is There Salt in the Sea? (1988, TV Movie) - Uschi's Grandmother (final film role)

External links

1900 births
1994 deaths
Austrian silent film actresses
Actresses from Vienna
Exiles from Nazi Germany
Austrian television actresses
Austrian film actresses
20th-century Austrian actresses